() is a near-Earth object with a diameter of 1.4 kilometers and potentially hazardous asteroid of the Apollo group. It has a well determined orbit with an observation arc of 64 years including precovery images by Palomar Observatory dating back to 1954.

Discovery 
It was discovered on 9 July 2002 by the Lincoln Near-Earth Asteroid Research team (LINEAR) at the U.S. Lincoln Laboratory Experimental Test Site near Socorro, New Mexico. At the time of discovery it only had a 6-day observation arc of 9–14 July, which poorly constrained possible future positions of the asteroid.

Despite inflammatory press reports, the object had a "low probability" of impact, approximately one in a million, for 1 February 2019. On 22 July 2002, NEODyS posted a positive 0.18 Palermo Scale rating. Further observations of the object quickly lowered the probability. On 25 July 2002, the hazard rating on the Palermo scale was lowered to −0.25. However, the discovery of the object with a Palermo initial rating of 0.06 was a historical event for the NEO observation program.

 was removed from the Sentry Risk Table on 1 August 2002 (23 days after discovery), meaning there is no risk of an impact by it in the next 100 years. On 13 January 2019, the asteroid safely passed  from Earth with a 3-sigma uncertainty region of about ±108 km.

On 30 January 2020, the asteroid safely passed  from 2 Pallas.

References

External links 
 Simulation of the shrinking uncertainty region for 2019 Jan 28 Peter Thomas
 
 
 

089959
089959
089959
089959
20190113
20020709